William Brandon may refer to:
William Brandon (died 1491) (c. 1425–1491), English knight
William Brandon (standard-bearer) (1456–1485), supporter of Henry VII of England's conquest and father of Charles Brandon, 1st Duke of Suffolk, son of the above
William Brandon (author) (1914–2002), American writer and historian
William Brandon (Wisconsin politician) (1815–1891), Wisconsin State Assemblyman
William L. Brandon (1801–1890), Confederate officer
William W. Brandon (1868–1934), former Governor of Alabama
William Brandon (musician), alternative rock musician who played with Ocha la Rocha
William Brandon (MP), Member of Parliament (MP) for New Shoreham
Will Brandon, character in All for Peggy